Miss Gay America is a national pageant for female impersonators. Established in 1972, the pageant is based on the Miss America contest and follows a similar format.

Each year, contestants compete at various city, state, and direct regional preliminaries for the opportunity to advance to the official Miss Gay America pageant. Titleholders are often seen as the best in the industry and are frequently hired to entertain in a variety of venues, such as Las Vegas shows, cruise ships, and LGBT events.

The Miss Gay America pageant system is the longest running pageant system for female impersonators. It is one of the four major pageant systems for the art form, in addition to Continental Pageantry, Gay USofA Pageantry, and Entertainer of the Year. Miss Gay America is unique in that it is the only national pageant that prohibits contestants from using female hormones or having undergone any feminizing plastic surgery, such as breast implants or liquid-silicone injections below the neck.

Lady Gaga, on the 10th of September 2017, was crowned as the first Honorary Miss Gay America.

The current Miss Gay America titleholder is Tatiyanna Voche’, the 51st titleholder, crowned on January 20, 2023 in Little Rock, Arkansas

History

In 1971, Jerry Peek opened the Watch Your Hat & Coat Saloon in Nashville, Tennessee, the city's first gay dance and show bar. Having an understanding of the female illusionist state pageants occurring in various show bars in other states, Peek decided to establish a national level pageant to further recognize the best entertainers. On June 25, 1972, the first pageant was held at Peek's Nashville saloon. Norman Jones, performing as Norma Kristie, competed representing Arkansas and was crowned the winner of the 1973 pageant and emeritus titleholder of the Miss Gay America Pageant system. In 1975, Jones assumed ownership of the pageant and later formed Norma Kristie, Inc., operating and directing the Miss Gay America pageant and the Mr. Gay All-America Contest systems. In 2005, Norman Jones retired from the pageant's regular operations and sold the Miss Gay America pageantry system to Larry Tyger and Terry Eason of L&T Entertainment. On February 4, 2016 Michael Dutzer and Rob Mansman of Mad Angel Entertainment purchased the Miss Gay America pageant From L & T Entertainment.

At the 2016 pageant in Memphis, Mad Angel Entertainment announced they will be retiring the solo talent category. Starting in 2017 Presentation will be judged for the top 10 contestants in its place. Also starting in 2017 contestants are able to change their talent numbers on the final night of the competition.

Mad Angel Entertainment announced in January 2017 that they will be bringing back Mr. Gay All-American as Mr. Gay America. The pageant was held on July 2, 2017 in Dallas, TX with the winner being Kyle Ean. The contest winners included Judas Elliot, and Simba Hall in 2018 and 2019. In 2021 following the Impacts of the Coronavirus pandemic, Prideland Productions, an entity formed by Simba Hall succeeded to maintain control and operations of the Mr division of the system, with a contest scheduled to be held in August 2021 in Las Vegas, NV.

The 2022 Miss Gay America pageant ushers the 50th symbol of excellence in to the prestigious system and is scheduled to be held in early 2022 following return to safety guidelines surrounding the coronavirus pandemic affecting persons around the world.

Qualification
Contestants for the national Miss Gay America pageant qualify through franchised state and direct regional preliminaries. The winner and first alternate of the preliminary contests advance to the national pageant. Many states require contestants to first compete in franchised city preliminaries, where the winner and first alternate advance to the state pageant.

Competition
Historically, pageant competition consisted of interview, evening gown and talent categories. Later a Contemporary Fashion category for sportswear was added. After about a decade it was changed to Creative Fashion, a category that was never fully understood by judges or contestants and was later changed to Creative Costume. It was eventually replaced with Solo Talent. While some of the contestants perform live vocal, dance or comedy skits, the vast majority showcase their talent of lip syncing to prerecorded music. Current categories are Male Interview, Solo Talent, Evening Gown, On-Stage Interview, and Talent.

Currently, the national pageant consists of 3 nights of preliminary competition, where all contestants compete in male interview, solo talent, evening gown, and production talent. Awards for each night of these categories are presented on the 4th night of the pageant week during the official Miss Gay America Revue Show, where former titleholders return to entertain. The final competition night is held on the fifth night, typically at a larger and more formal venue, and the top 10 finalists are announced. These finalists then compete again in evening gown, stage interview, and production talent. At the end of the final pageant, the top four runners-up are announced and the winner is crowned.

List of past winners

Notable events

Shan Covington's title revocation
In 1976, Shan Covington's title was revoked 7 months into her reign for conduct unbecoming of a Miss Gay America titleholder. The title was offered to the 1976 First Alternate, Michael Andrews, who declined because she wanted to win the title. The title was then passed to the 1976 Second Alternate, Dani Daletto. This incident sparked the development of the current mandatory first alternate succession rules.

Showtime's Dream Boy's Revue
In 1985, titleholder Naomi Sims was also the crowned winner of the 1985 National Female Impersonator of the Year contest. That contest was organized by Norma Kristie, Inc., owner of the Miss Gay America pageant, but was created, produced and televised by the Showtime network in a television special called Dream Boy's Revue. The audience believed the pageant was real, but according to "finalist" Rachel Wells, the pageant was staged and each of the contestants were paid substantially to "compete." Additionally, the televised special faced issues with copyright infringement associated with certain lip syncing performances, which required much of the talent portion of the show to be dubbed when it was aired.

Death of titleholder Ramona LeGer'
In 1995, titleholder Ramona LeGer' died 5 months into her reign due to complications from AIDS. First Alternate Patti Le Plae Safe requested not to be crowned or wear the crown during the pageant year, instead serving as the official Miss Gay America Representative to honor Ramona LeGer's memory. Patti Le Plae Safe was crowned Miss Gay America 1995 in a special ceremony prior to the 1996 pageant in Little Rock, Arkansas. Patti donated large portions of her performance fees to AIDS charities while representing Miss Gay America 1995.

Alyssa Edwards' title revocation
In 2010, winner Alyssa Edwards had her title revoked due to scheduling conflicts with previous engagements and her Miss Gay America duties. The title was passed to the 2010 first alternate, Coco Montrese, who was crowned in a special ceremony at The Grey Fox Nightclub in St. Louis, MO. Alyssa Edwards and Coco Montrese appeared as contestants in season five of RuPaul's Drag Race, where the 2010 Miss Gay America pageant issues and animosity between Alyssa and Coco played a central theme throughout the season. L&T Productions later released a statement about the dramatized events, explaining their reasons for revoking Alyssa's title and their lack of knowledge about how this issue would be portrayed in the television series. They had been approached by the producers to provide copyright clearance for both Alyssa's and Coco's official Miss Gay America photos.

Mr. Gay All-American
The Mr. Gay All-American Contest was founded by Norma Kristie, Inc. in 1983 by the operators of Miss Gay America, Norman Jones and Carmel Santiago (Lady Baronessa, Miss Gay America 1974). The MGAA Contest was started to provide a venue for gay men to showcase their intellect, community service, and talent. It launched careers in professional entertainment for many young gay men. MGAA was the first contest of its kind, and its winner was considered to be the co-titleholder to Miss Gay America.

In 1995, Jones sold the Mr. Gay All-American Contest to Gib Hauersperger, who had been the contest director since the death of Carmel Santiago. Hauersperger operated the pageant until his retirement in 1999. Paul Lopez (Mr. Gay All-American 2000) operated the contest from 1999 to 2003, when Richard Greer (Mr. Gay All-American 1999) assumed the directorial role. John Beebe (Mr. Gay All-American 1996) succeeded Greer as director. In 2009, Beebe and Hauersperger announced that the Mr. Gay All-American Contest system would cease operations indefinitely.

Mr. Gay America
In January 2017, Mad Angel Entertainment announced the return of Mr. Gay All-American as Mr. Gay America.

In film
The 2008 documentary film Pageant presents a behind-the-scenes look at the 34th Miss Gay America pageant and some of the competitors, many of whom have since won the title of Miss Gay America.

In 1982, Elizabeth Gracen, Miss America 1982, made her directorial debut with a documentary feature called The Damn Deal. The film is an intimate portrait of three female impersonators participating in the events surrounding the Miss Gay Little Rock Arkansas America pageant.

Discography

See also
Miss Gay Philippines
Miss International Queen
Miss Tiffany's Universe

References

External links
 

LGBT events in the United States
LGBT beauty pageants
Drag events
1972 establishments in Tennessee
Recurring events established in 1972
Annual events in the United States
American awards
Transgender beauty pageants